Toffe Jongens onder de Mobilisatie  is a 1914 Dutch silent comedy film directed by Jan van Dommelen.

Cast
Annie Bos ... Adèle
Louis van Dommelen ... Baron / Baron
Nelly De Heer ... Directrice / Manager
Sien De la Mar-Kloppers ... Angèle (as Sien Klopper)
Roosje Ménagé-Challa ... Vriendin van Adèle / Friend of Adèle
Catharina Kinsbergen-Rentmeester
Jan van Dommelen ... Vader van Adèle / Adèles father
Alex Benno ... Kapitein / Captain
Christine van Meeteren

External links 
 

1914 films
Dutch black-and-white films
Films directed by Jan van Dommelen
1914 comedy films
Dutch silent short films
1914 short films
Comedy short films
Dutch comedy films
Silent comedy films